Government Medical College, Kathua is a full-fledged tertiary referral Government Medical college. It was established in the year 2019. This college imparts the degree Bachelor of Medicine and Surgery (MBBS). The college is affiliated to University of Jammu and is recognized by National Medical Commission.  The hospital associated with the college is one of the largest hospitals in the Kathua. The selection to the college is done on the basis of merit through National Eligibility and Entrance Test. Yearly undergraduate student intake is 100 from the year 2019.

Courses
Government Medical College, Kathua undertakes education and training of students MBBS courses

See also

References

External links 
 http://gmckathua.in/

2019 establishments in Jammu and Kashmir
Educational institutions established in 2019
Medical colleges in Jammu and Kashmir